New Freeport is an unincorporated community and census-designated place (CDP) in Freeport Township, Greene County, Pennsylvania, in the United States. It is located in the far southwestern corner of Pennsylvania along Pennsylvania Route 18. As of the 2020 Census, the population was 77.

Demographics

References

External links

Census-designated places in Greene County, Pennsylvania
Census-designated places in Pennsylvania